Holy Angel University is a private Catholic research university in Angeles City, Philippines.  Founded in June 1933 by Don Juan Nepomuceno and Fr. Pedro Paulo Santos, who was later named as the Archbishop of Cáceres, is considered the first lay-founded Catholic school as well as the first co-educational Catholic high school. With a student population of over 21,000, it is the largest private institute of education with the largest student population in a single campus in Central Luzon.

History 
Holy Angel University was founded in June 1933 by Don Juan Nepomuceno and Fr. Pedro Paulo Santos. It is considered the first lay-founded Catholic School as well as the first co-educational Catholic school.

Dr. Luís María. R. Calingo began his term as the University President on June 1, 2015, taking over from Engr. Geromin T. Nepomuceno, Jr. who served as the Acting President upon the resignation of Dr. Villanueva in June 2014.

Campus
The university sits in an 8-hectare urban campus. The university campus features the Epiphany of Angels Park that has an exhibit of the Seven Archangels and the Holy Guardian Angel. The university houses the original image of the Holy Guardian Angel commissioned by Don Juan Nepomuceno in the University Chapel. The university library is housed at the second and third floors of the San Francisco de Javier building; along with the university theater in the ground floor and the chambers of the University President in the fourth floor.

Academics
As a Roman Catholic learning institution, aside from the major and professional subjects, all undergraduate students are required to take 12 units of Catholic Theology classes. The students are also required to attend 8 units of physical education class, and a choice from ROTC, civic welfare service training (CWTS) and literacy training service (LTS). The university is home to eight undergraduate colleges, with the School of Business and Accountancy as the oldest. The university also has a high school and laboratory elementary school.

The Commission on Higher Education granted autonomous status to the university and recognized three of its programs as Centers of Development, namely in Business Administration, Industrial Engineering and Teacher Education. It is also accredited by the Philippine Accrediting Association of Schools, Colleges and Universities (PAASCU) and the International Assembly for Collegiate Business Education (IACBE).

Notable alumni
 Dennis Anthony Uy - Founder and CEO of Converge ICT
 Emma Tiglao - Filipina actress, model and beauty pageant titleholder who won the Binibining Pilipinas Intercontinental 2019 title.
 Ivan Mayrina - Filipino broadcaster, journalist, reporter and news anchor currently working in GMA Network.
 Calvin Abueva - Filipino professional basketball player
 Ronnie Liang - Filipino singer, actor, and a licensed pilot.
 Rafael Yabut - Filipino engineer
 Carla Balingit - is a beauty queen from the Philippines who has competed at Miss Universe 2003.
 Cesar L. Villanueva - was the former Dean of the Ateneo Law School in Makati, Philippines.
 Raymond Manalo - Filipino singer, and the runner up to Rachelle Ann Go of the program Search for a Star produced by Viva Television and co-produced and broadcast by GMA Network in 2003 to 2004.
 Antonio Aquitania - Filipino actor, comedian, host, and model.
 Florentino Lavarias - current archbishop of San Fernando.
 Francesca Taruc - Filipina actress, TV host, model and beauty pageant titleholder who was crowned Miss Freedom of the World Philippines 2018.

References

External links
Official Website
Graduate School portal
Center for Kapampangan Studies
University Library (Learning and Resource Center)
Holy Angel University in Pampanga

Universities and colleges in Angeles City
Catholic universities and colleges in the Philippines
1933 establishments in the Philippines
Educational institutions established in 1933